The Nikon D750 is a full-frame DSLR camera announced by Nikon on September 12, 2014. It is an extensive upgrade from the D610, but with the same general body and control characteristics, along with 24 megapixel resolution. Despite the 7, there is little relationship with the D700, which was the precursor to the D800.  The D600 and D610 evolved as a full-frame consumer cameras with similar structure and controls to the D7000 series of cropped frame cameras.  The D750 shares similar structure and controls with the cropped-frame D7500.

The D750 includes technologies from the D810 in a smaller and lighter body, but with better low light performance, for both focus and image quality at high ISO. Nikon sees the D750 with "advanced video features" for videographers as well as a primary or secondary camera for fast handling and speed.  The camera can shoot at 6.5 frames per second at full resolution.

It has a newly developed 24.3-effective-megapixel image sensor (24.93 megapixel raw) with claimed lower image noise. The Expeed 4 processor from D4S/D810 and built-in Wi-Fi enable functions from the D810.  Its autofocus is the same as in the D4S and D810, but can autofocus with less light than the D810, down to -3 EV.

The D750 has a tilting LCD screen (the first full-frame DSLR with an adjustable screen, although several Nikon DX bodies have tilting or fully articulated screens), and is cited as "the lightest among Nikon's traditional pro series". The body is a light-weight weather-sealed monocoque construction with carbon-fiber-reinforced polymer at the front and magnesium alloy for the back and top.

The D750 has been succeeded by the Nikon D780

Reception
DxOMark reviewed the D750 sensor image quality and assigned it an overall score of 93.

Since its release, the camera has been praised for its impressive low-light capabilities and effective autofocus.

Digital Photography Review completed their review of the D750 in December 2014 and assigned it a Gold Award as well as a 90% numerical rating.

Nikon D750 vs D610
The Nikon D750 shares similar specifications when it comes to size, ergonomics and resolution. However, there are bigger differences when it comes to performance.
 Image Processor: EXPEED-4 VS EXPEED-3
 Continuous Shooting Speed: 6.5 FPS VS 6 FPS
 ISO Sensitivity: 100–12,800 VS 100–6,400
 Auto Focus: 51 AF points, 15 cross-type VS 39 AF points, 9 cross-type
 Video Maximum Resolution: 1080p @ 60fps VS 1080p @ 30fps
 LCD Display: 3.2″ diagonal TFT-LCD Tilting VS 3.2″ diagonal TFT-LCD
 Battery Life: 1,230 shots VS 900 shots

Issues
Some D750 bodies have been found to produce unwanted flare anomalies in certain shooting situations, namely when an intense light source is situated just above the frame of view. The problem is caused by a reflection of light within the internal components, and manifests in an irregular, discolored patch of light along the top of images. Nikon resolved to repair affected cameras at no cost.

References

External links

 Nikon D750, Nikon USA
 Nikon D750, Nikon Global
 Nikon D750 specifications, dpreview
 Nikon D750 User Manuals, Guides and Software Nikon Download-center
Review of Nikon D750, The Canvas Photography
Best Nikon Cameras, Nikon Cameras

D750
D750
Live-preview digital cameras
Cameras introduced in 2014
Full-frame DSLR cameras